Samuel Rutherford (March 15, 1870 – February 4, 1932) was an American politician, businessman, jurist and lawyer.

Rutherford was born near Culloden, Georgia in 1870, attended Washington and Lee University in Lexington, Virginia and graduated from the University of Georgia School of Law in Athens in 1894 with a Bachelor of Laws (B.L.) degree. He was admitted to the bar the same year and began practicing law in Forsyth, Georgia.

After serving as Mayor of Forsyth for three consecutive years, Rutherford served in the Georgia House of Representatives in 1896 and 1897. He then became the solicitor of the city court of Forsyth from 1898 to 1900. He returned to the Georgia General Assembly in 1909 and 1910 as a State Senator.

Rutherford began practicing of law again as well as farming. From 1921 to 1924, he returned to the Georgia House of Representatives. In 1925, he was elected as Democratic  representative of Georgia's 6th congressional district in the 69th United States Congress. He was reelected to that seat for three additional terms (70th, 71st and 72nd Congresses) and served from March 4, 1925, until his death from a heart attack in Washington, D.C., while in office on February 4, 1932. He was buried in Oakland Cemetery in Forsyth.

See also

 Politics of Georgia (U.S. state)
 List of United States Congress members who died in office (1900–49)

References

History of the University of Georgia, Thomas Walter Reed,  Imprint:  Athens, Georgia : University of Georgia, ca. 1949, pp.1630,1656

External links
 

1870 births
1932 deaths
People from Monroe County, Georgia
Washington and Lee University alumni
University of Georgia School of Law alumni
Georgia (U.S. state) lawyers
Mayors of places in Georgia (U.S. state)
Democratic Party members of the Georgia House of Representatives
Georgia (U.S. state) state court judges
Democratic Party Georgia (U.S. state) state senators
Burials in Georgia (U.S. state)
Democratic Party members of the United States House of Representatives from Georgia (U.S. state)